David John Simpson (born 23 February 1961) is a Scottish former first-class cricketer.

Simpson was born at Irvine in February 1945 and was educated in Ayr at Belmont Academy. He played club cricket for Ayr, captaining the side on two occasions; the first in 1987, with the second period from 1993 to 1995. Simpson made his debut for Scotland in a first-class match against Ireland at Glasgow in 1984; he made a second first-class appearance against Ireland the following season at Dublin. He scored 19 runs in these matches, with a highest score of 9. The following season, he made four List A one-day appearances against English county opponents in the 1985 Benson & Hedges Cup. In his four one-day matches, he scored 14 runs with a highest score of 7. Outside of cricket, Simpson worked in the insurance industry.

References

External links
 

1961 births
Living people
Sportspeople from Irvine, North Ayrshire
People educated at Belmont Academy
Scottish cricketers